Einstein is the title of an infotainment show on the German-speaking Swiss public television channel SRF 1. Einstein is an in-house production by Schweizer Radio und Fernsehen (SRF) and reports on phenomena and mysteries of everyday life and of life.

Profile 
Einstein claims to be the science magazine of the national Swiss radio and television network Schweizer Radio und Fernsehen, and weekly reports on current and profound topics from all fields of science by stories that inform, educate and entertain. This includes conventional science topics, as well as phenomena and mysteries of everyday life to explain sophisticated scientific topics by an experience reportage. For instance, Tobias Müller and Kathrin Hönegger, the present (as of July 2015) moderation crew participate in science experiments, assisted by science experts of the related fields that are documented. The posts of about 10 minutes are produced weekly, focus on Swiss national stories, and added by Einstein Spezial specials that are focussed on events of common interest, for instance on horse breeding in Switzerland, Swiss history related topics, important international science perceptions, and so on.

Broadcast 
Einstein started on 7 April 2007 and is broadcast from 21:00 to 21:50 on Thursday, except on public holidays. All contributions are available as a video stream, and usually additionally contents expound the weekly contributions. Einstein is broadcast widely in the Swiss Standard German language, excluded some interviews in Swiss German. After the premiere on SRF 1, the program is repeated several times on SRF 1 and SRF info. The journalistic use of the Swiss German language, mainly in direct conversation with interviewees as also practiced in 10vor10 and Schweiz aktuell, is a further 'trademark'.

Menschen-Technik-Wissenschaft 
Menschen-Technik-Wissenschaft (MTW) was the preceding science show produced by the present SRF broadcasting company. MTW started in 1975 and was for many years the most popular program on Swiss television, but was replaced by Einstein in the context of restructuring.

References

External links 
  

Schweizer Radio und Fernsehen original programming
2000s Swiss television series
2010s Swiss television series
2020s Swiss television series
German-language television shows
Current affairs shows
2007 Swiss television series debuts
Science and technology in Switzerland
Documentary television series about science